Aurelio Crispin Francisco Hevia y Alcalde (October 25, 1866 - January 22, 1945)  was a colonel in the Cuban Revolution and was the Cuban Secretary of Interior.

During the administration of Mario García Menocal he was appointed as the Cuban Secretary of Interior.

In 1931 he was imprisoned at La Cabaña for opposing the new president.

His son served as President of Cuba for three days, from January 15, 1934, to January 18, 1934.

He died on January 22, 1945.

References

External links

1866 births
1945 deaths
Cuban politicians